The Lockheed EP-3 is an electronic signals reconnaissance variant of the P-3 Orion, operated by the United States Navy.

Development 
A total of 12 P-3C aircraft were converted to replace older versions of the aircraft, which had been converted in the late 1960s and early 1970s. The aircraft is known by the acronym ARIES, or "Airborne Reconnaissance Integrated Electronic System". and has Signals intelligence (SIGINT) capabilities. SIGINT is the interception of signals, whether communications between people (communications intelligence—abbreviated to COMINT) or from electronic signals not directly used in communication (electronic intelligence—abbreviated to ELINT). The EP-3E generally has a crew of 24, including linguists, cryptographers and technicians.

The squadrons that flew the EP-3E also flew the Lockheed EC-121 Warning Star from 1962 to 1974 and the Douglas EA-3B Skywarrior from 1960 to 1991.  There are 11 EP-3Es in the Navy's inventory, the last of which was delivered in 1997.

Hainan Island incident

On 1 April 2001, an aerial collision between a United States Navy EP-3E ARIES II, a signals reconnaissance version and a People's Liberation Army Navy Shenyang J-8II fighter resulted in an international incident between the United States and China.  Operating about 70 miles (110 km) away from the PRC island province of Hainan Island, the EP-3 was intercepted by two J-8II fighters.  One of the J-8IIs collided with it.  The J-8II crashed into the sea and the pilot, Lt. Cdr. Wang, was seen to eject after the collision.  His body was never recovered and he was declared dead.  The EP-3 came close to becoming uncontrollable, at one point sustaining a nearly inverted roll, but was able to make a successful, unauthorized  emergency landing at Lingshui airfield on Hainan island, where the two J-8II fighters involved in the incident had been based. At least 15 distress signals from the Orion had gone unanswered.  The crew and the plane were subsequently detained by Chinese authorities because of the death of the Chinese pilot.

After several days of interrogations, the crew was repatriated separately to the United States while the aircraft remained in China, reportedly taken apart for research on American intelligence technology.  Although the crew attempted to destroy as much classified material, hardware, and software on the aircraft prior to the emergency landing, there is little doubt that the EP-3 was exploited by Chinese intelligence services.  An American team was later permitted to enter Hainan in order to dismantle the aircraft, which was subsequently airlifted on board two of Russia's Polet Airlines Antonov An-124 Ruslan back to the United States for reassembly and repair.

Other incidents 
On 29 January 2018, a near accident was reported on the Black Sea, when a Russian Su-27 passed a U.S. EP-3 at a distance of several feet.

In a separate incident, on 5 November 2018, a U.S. EP-3 was again claimed to have been closely passed in international airspace by a Russian Su-27. 

On 19 July 2019, a U.S. EP-3 was "performing a multi-nationally recognized and approved mission in international airspace" over the Caribbean Sea, when a Venezuelan Su-30 aggressively shadowed it at an unsafe distance.

Fictional incidents

EP-X
Boeing has started working on an unscheduled replacement aircraft, the EP-X, based on their 737.

On 16 August 2009, The Navy issued an "EP-X Analysis of Alternatives" that called for "information useful for the execution of the Electronic Patrol-X (EP-X) program which will recapitalize the EP-3E aircraft to provide tactical, theater, and national level Intelligence, Surveillance, Reconnaissance, and Targeting (ISR&T) support to Carrier Strike Groups and to Theater, Combatant, and National Commanders."

On 23 September 2009, leaked Navy budget documents for FY2011 revealed that the EP-X program would be delayed rather than started in that year.

On 1 February 2010, President Obama unveiled his proposed budget for 2010. This budget called for, among other things, canceling the EP-X program.

Replacement
After the cancellation of the EP-X Program, the U.S. Navy has planned to replace the EP-3E Aries II with the Northrop Grumman MQ-4C Triton unmanned aircraft and the MQ-8B Fire Scout unmanned helicopter. All P-3 Orion aircraft assigned to special projects squadrons (VPU) and all EP-3E Aries II aircraft are expected to fully retire by 2025.

Variants

 EP-3A: Seven modified for electronic reconnaissance testing.
 EP-3B: Least known of all in the P-3 family. Three P-3As (BuNo 149669, BuNo 149673, and BuNo 149678) were obtained by the CIA from the U.S. Navy under Project STSPIN in May 1963, as the replacement aircraft for CIA's own covert operation fleet of RB-69A/P2V-7Us. Converted by Aerosystems Division of LTV at Greenville, Texas, the three P-3As were simply known as "black" P-3As under Project Axial. Officially transferred from U.S. Navy to CIA in June/July 1964. LTV Aerosystems converted the three aircraft to be both ELINT and COMINT platforms. The first of the three "black" P-3As arrived in Taiwan and were officially transferred to ROCAF's top secret "Black Bat" Squadron on 22 June 1966. Armed with 4 Sidewinder short range AAM missiles for self-defense, the three "black" P-3As flew peripheral missions along the China coast to collect SIGINT and air samples. When the project was terminated in January 1967, all three "black" P-3As were flown to NAS Alameda, California, for long term storage. Two of the three aircraft (BuNo 149669 and BuNo 149678) were converted into the only two EP-3Bs in existence by Lockheed at Burbank in September 1967, while the third aircraft (149673) was converted by Lockheed in 1969–1970 to serve as a development aircraft for various electronic programs. The two EP-3Bs, known as "Bat Rack", owing to their period of service with Taiwan's "Black Bat" Squadron, were issued to the U.S. Navy's VQ-1 Squadron in 1969 and deployed to Da Nang, Vietnam. In the 1980s these two planes were based at the Naval Air Facility, Atsugi, Japan with the Atsugi VQ-1 detachment. Later, the two EP-3Bs were converted to EP-3E ARIES, along with 10 EP-3As. The 12 EP-3Es retired in 1990s, when replaced by 12 EP-3E ARIES II.
 EP-3: ELINT aircraft for the Japanese Maritime Self-Defense Force.
 EP-3E ARIES: 10 P-3As and two EP-3Bs were converted into ELINT aircraft.
 EP-3E ARIES II: 12 P-3Cs were converted into ELINT aircraft. Last delivered in 1997.
 EP-3J: Two, modified from P-3As, for FEWSG were uses as simulated adversary EW platforms in exercises; later transferred to the former Tactical Electronic Warfare Squadron 33 (VAQ-33), then transferred to the former Fleet Air Reconnaissance Squadron 11 (VQ-11).

Operators

Current operators

Japan
 Japan Maritime Self-Defense Force – 5 EP-3

United States
 United States Navy
 Active squadrons
 VQ-1 based at Naval Air Station Whidbey Island
 Former squadrons
 VQ-2 was based at Naval Station Rota, Spain until 2006 when it moved to Naval Air Station Whidbey Island (disestablished on 17 May 2012).

Specifications (EP-3E-II - P-3C as indicated)

See also

 Chinese espionage in the United States

References

Further reading
 Winchester, Jim, ed. Military Aircraft of the Cold War (The Aviation Factfile). London: Grange Books plc, 2006. .

External links

 P-3C fact file  and P-3 history page on U.S. Navy site 
 
 NASA Wallops Flight Facility Aircraft Office operators of the NASA P-3
 EP-3E on CombatAircraft.com

P-003, E
1960s United States military reconnaissance aircraft
Four-engined tractor aircraft
Low-wing aircraft
Four-engined turboprop aircraft
Signals intelligence
Lockheed P-3 Orion